The Ramapo Mountains are a forested chain of the Appalachian Mountains in northeastern New Jersey and southeastern New York, in the United States.

Several parks and forest preserves encompass parts of the Ramapos (see Points of interest, below), and many hiking trails are in the Ramapos, including sections of the Appalachian Trail, which is maintained and updated in the Ramapo Mountains by the New York–New Jersey Trail Conference.

The mountains are named after the Ramapo Fault, which trends northeast to southwest, and separates the eastern Piedmont geologic province from the Highland province. 

The Ramapos are composed of granite, gneiss, and marble, as old as 1.3 billion years.

Points of interest
 Bear Mountain State Park
 Doodletown, New York
 Harriman State Park
 Kakiat County Park
 Long Path
 Monksville Reservoir
 Ramapo Mountain State Forest
 Ramapo Valley County Reservation
 Ringwood Manor
 Ringwood State Park
 New Jersey State Botanical Garden
 Sterling Forest State Park
 Kitty Ann Mountain, New Jersey

Flora and fauna

 Many types of plants, including oak trees, cover the mountains.
 Diverse wildlife, including white-tailed deer and pheasants, inhabit the Ramapo Mountains.

Depiction In The Movies
Out of the Furnace

See also
 Ramapo Valley County Reservation
 Ramapo Mountain State Forest
 Ramapo River
 Ramapough Mountain Indians

External links
 Harriman Hikers
 New York New Jersey Trail Conference
 U.S. Geological Survey

Palisades Interstate Park system
Mountain ranges of New Jersey
 
Mountain ranges of New York (state)
Landforms of Orange County, New York
Landforms of Rockland County, New York
Landforms of Bergen County, New Jersey
Landforms of Passaic County, New Jersey